Lawrence Eugene "Larry" Marshall (born March 2, 1950) is a former professional American football player who played defensive back, kick returner, and wide receiver in the National Football League. He played seven seasons for the Kansas City Chiefs, the Minnesota Vikings, the Philadelphia Eagles, and the Los Angeles Rams. He has the distinction for having 300 career touches (162 punt returns and 138 kick off returns).

Marshall attended Bishop Egan High School in Fairless Hills, PA from 1964 - 1968 and under the direction of Coach Dick Bedesem, helped the Eagles to back-to-back Philadelphia City Title wins in 1966 and 1967. 

1950 births
Living people
Players of American football from Philadelphia
American football defensive backs
American football wide receivers
Maryland Terrapins football players
Kansas City Chiefs players
Minnesota Vikings players
Philadelphia Eagles players
Los Angeles Rams players